Derek Murray may refer to:

Derek Murray (Australian footballer) (born 1980), Australian rules football player
Derek Murray (Gaelic footballer), Irish Gaelic football player
Derek Murray (Scottish footballer) (born 1960), Scottish football player
Derek Murray (sports presenter), Scottish television presenter

See also
Deryck Murray (born 1943), West Indian cricketer